Chongqing North railway station is a railway station located in Yubei District, Chongqing, China. It is served by the Yuhuai Railway, Suining–Chongqing Railway and Yuli Railway, and operated by the China Railway Chengdu Group.

Name
Prior to the construction of this station at its present site, Shapingba railway station was known as Chongqing North railway station. It was subsequently renamed to avoid confusion and to better reflect the geographic nature of both stations.

Structure
This station consists of two separate departure halls; the eastern hall is for long-distance services and the western hall is for high-speed CRH trains. Arrivals are through a common underground hall.

Service at this station is separated into North and South Courses. The South Course handles long-distance trains to many parts of China. The North Course is currently being expanded and will handle mostly high-speed intercity services.

Metro
Chongqing North Station North Square station (Line 4 & Line 10)
Chongqing North Station South Square station (Line 3 & Line 10 & Loop Line)

Service
This station currently handles most long-distance train services to and from Chongqing, whilst Chongqing railway station is closed for renovations (due to finish in 2015). It is also the main high-speed railway connection to Chengdu via Suining.

History
The station has been in operation since October 2006.

See also
Chongqing railway station
Chongqing West railway station
Shapingba railway station

References

Railway stations in Chongqing
Railway stations in China opened in 2006
Stations on the Chengdu–Chongqing Intercity Railway